The Hannover CL.III was a German military aircraft of World War I. It was a two-seat multi-role aircraft, primarily used as a ground attack machine. Like the other Hannover "light-C-class", or "CL" designated aircraft designed by Hermann Dorner, it included an unusual biplane tail, allowing for a greater firing arc for the tail gunner. Until the introduction of the aircraft, such tails had only been used on larger aircraft.

Design

Compared to the preceding CL.II, the CL.III had redesigned ailerons with aerodynamic balances that overhung the wingtips, a modification that provided greater manoeuvrability, especially at the low levels that the CL.III was expected to be operating at in its new ground-attack role as the Schutzstaffeln (escort squadrons) were reassigned as Schlachtstaffeln (battle squadrons). It was also intended that it should use the excellent Mercedes D.III engine, but the Idflieg gave priority for these engines to fighter production, and most CL.IIIs were produced with the same Argus engine that the CL.II had used. The Argus engined variant was designated CL.IIIa.

After the war, the CL.III was developed into the HaWa F.3, a limousine aircraft with seats for two passengers in an enclosed cabin, where the gunner's cockpit had been.

Variants
Hannover CL.III
Powered by a 119-kW (160-hp) Mercedes D.III engine.
Hannover CL.IIIa
CL III powered by a 134-kW (180-hp) Argus As.III engine
Hannover CL.IIIb
Experimental model of the CL.III, with a two-bay wing.
HaWa F.3
A post-war limousine conversion of CL.III aircraft, with a 2-seat limousine cabin behind the pilot's cockpit and additional struts between the wings and fwd undercarriage strut mounts.

Operators

Luftstreitkräfte
 (Postwar)
Latvian Air Force

Soviet Air Force

Specifications (CL.IIIa)

See also

References

Bibliography

Grosz, Peter M, Windsock Datafile No.23-Hannover Cl.III, Albatros Publications, 1990. 

1910s German attack aircraft
Hannover aircraft
Aircraft first flown in 1917
Single-engined tractor aircraft